Karen Huger ( Wooden; born May 3, 1963) is an American television personality. She is best known as a cast member on the reality TV series The Real Housewives of Potomac, serving as a housewife since the show's premiere in 2016.

Career 
In 2016, Huger was announced as one of the six main cast members in the first season of Bravo's The Real Housewives of Potomac, which premiered on January 17, 2016. Since then, she has been a main cast member of the show for all seven seasons. The most recent season of The Real Housewives of Potomac premiered on October 9, 2022.

In 2019, Huger released a fragrance line, "La' Dame!"  The fragrance is sold in many different stores, for example Bloomingdale's.
Huger further expanded her brand by producing a 3-wick candle along with the fragrance.

In 2021, Huger was sworn in as the Surry County ambassador for tourism.

Karen's Grande Dame Reunion 
In 2021, Bravo TV announced The Real Housewives of Potomac'''s first spin-off show: Karen's Grande Dame Reunion'', which premiered on April 17, 2022. The two-part special highlighted Huger's return to Surry County, along with her husband and daughter, for her first family reunion. As detailed alongside the trailer, "Karen Huger is about to have her first-ever family reunion, but it's not all fun and games…" Karen comes together with her family and learns about their history and lineage.

Personal life 
Huger was born and raised in Spring Grove, Virginia, "on a large family farm that has been in her family for more than 100 years". She spent a large part of her childhood at this farm in Surry County, where her father, Benjamin B. Wooden Jr., raised her. 

In late 2017, on Thanksgiving morning, Huger's mother died due to kidney failure. Months after her mother's death, her father, Benjamin B. Wooden Jr. died after a long battle with Alzheimer's disease. Due to this, Karen has been a strong supporter of the Alzheimer's Association and has done many charity events in order to raise money and help find a cure for the disease.

Filmography

References

External links 

1963 births
People from Surry County, Virginia
Lists of reality show participants
The Real Housewives cast members
African-American television personalities
Living people